Uloma culinaris is a species of darkling beetle, belonging to the genus Uloma.

It is native to Eurasia.

References

External links

Tenebrionidae